The KR212V is a racing motorcycle developed by Kenny Roberts' MotoGP team, Team Roberts, and uses the customer 800 cc V4 engine from the Honda RC212V bike. It replaces the KR211V from 2006 to compete in the 2007 MotoGP series and was to be piloted by Kenny Roberts, Jr., who effectively retired halfway through that season. The rest of the 2007 season was completed by his brother Kurtis Roberts.

KR212V results

(key) (results in bold indicate pole position; results in italics indicate fastest lap)

External links 
 Team Roberts official website

Grand Prix motorcycles
Motorcycles introduced in 2007